Ngāti Paretekawa (Paretekawa) are a very numerous hapū (sub-tribe, or clan) of the Ngāti Maniapoto confederation in New Zealand, whose ancestral tribal lands are located in both the northern King Country, including the areas around the Kakepuku, Pirongia,  in the vicinity of Te Awamutu, Kihikihi, Pokuru, Kakepuku, and Kawhia, with sub-hapu interests in the southern King Country area of the Mokau  and Kawhia, at the foothills of Kahuwera Mountain.

Ngati Paretekawa was named after eponymous ancestress Paretekawa , the daughter of Ngati Maniapoto chief TeKanawa, and Ngati Maniapoto me Ngati Apakura woman called Whaeapare.

Paretekawa traditions recount that the Ngati Paretekawa hapu origins became recognised in the period of Peehi Tukorehu and his Tuakana (elder brothers) Te Uaki, Te Akanui, and Te Rangihiroa and tuahine (sister) Whaeapare II. while others who descend from Tukorehu dispute this assertion, allegedly based on evidence by Te Winitana Tupotahi. Peehi Tukorehu was grand father of Te Winitana Tupotahi, and grand uncle of Manga Rewi Maniapoto,

According to Māori Land Court evidence given by Te Winitana Tupotahi and Te Kohika Te Huia, as a result of a disagreement between  Te Akanui and one of his teina (younger sibling) Peehi Tukorehu. That section of Ngati Paretekawa   under the leadership of their chief Peehi Tukorehu, his elder brother Te Rangihiroa, and sister Wheapare II, and their whanau and Ngati Paretekawa hapu left district for Kawhia and eventually settled in the Marakopa region. Leaving Te Akanui, including Rewi Manga Maniapoto and others of Paretekawa  and Kaputuhi  in occupation of their ancestral tribal lands in the Otawhao, Moeawha and Turata..

The eventual invasion of those lands by British forces in 1864 saw the final loss of the bulk of those ancestral tribal lands to Crown confiscation by the Crowns Government in New Zealand-Aotearoa. A branches of Ngati Paretekawa also migrated to Taumaranui, Kawhia, and Morakopa during the Land Wars.

 
Waipa District